The UK Singles Chart is one of many music charts compiled by the Official Charts Company that calculates the best-selling singles of the week in the United Kingdom. Since 2004 the chart has been based on the sales of both physical singles and digital downloads, with airplay figures excluded from the official chart. This list shows singles that peaked in the Top 10 of the UK Singles Chart during 2011, as well as singles which peaked in 2010 and 2012 but were in the top 10 in 2011. The entry date is when the song appeared in the top 10 for the first time (week ending, as published by the Official Charts Company, which is six days after the chart is announced).

One-hundred and thirty-eight singles were in the top ten in 2011. Twelve singles from 2010 remained in the top 10 for several weeks at the beginning of the year, "Good Feeling" by Flo Rida and "Paradise" by Coldplay were released in 2011 but did not reach their peak until 2012. "What's My Name?" by Rihanna featuring Drake and "Who's That Chick" by David Guetta featuring Rihanna were the singles from 2010 to reach their peak in 2011. Fifty-one artists scored multiple entries in the top 10 in 2011. Christina Perri, Ed Sheeran, Jessie J, Little Mix and Rizzle Kicks were among the many artists who achieved their first UK charting top 10 single in 2011.

According to figures released by the Official Charts Company, 2011 saw the biggest amount of single sales since 2004, with around 178 million singles being purchased.

The 2010 Christmas number-one, "When We Collide" by X Factor series 7 winner Matt Cardle, remained at number-one for the first two weeks of 2011. The first new number-one single of the year was "What's My Name?" by Rihanna featuring Drake. Overall, thirty-one different singles peaked at number-one in 2011, with Rihanna, Pitbull, Olly Murs, Example and Bruno Mars (2) having the joint most singles hit that position.

Background

Multiple entries
One-hundred and thirty-eight singles charted in the top 10 in 2011, with one-hundred and twenty-six singles reaching their peak this year.

Fifty-one artists scored multiple entries in the top 10 in 2011. Rihanna secured the record for most top 10 hits in 2011 with seven hit singles. Her total included the number-one singles "Only Girl (In the World)", What's My Name?" (featuring Drake) and "We Found Love" with Calvin Harris. "We Found Love" spent the longest time at number one in 2011, with six weeks on top of the charts. David Guetta's five top 10 singles included collaborations with Flo Rida and Nicki Minaj on "Where Them Girls At" and "Sweat" featuring Snoop Dogg. Jessie J and JLS both had four top ten singles in 2011.

Chart debuts
Fifty-seven artists achieved their first top 10 single in 2011, either as a lead or featured artist. Of these, five went on to record another hit single that year: Avicii, Little Mix, Nero, Skylar Grey and Wiz Khalifa. Ed Sheeran, Rizzle Kicks and Wretch 32 all scored two more top 10 singles in 2011. Jessie J had three other entries in her breakthrough year.

The following table (collapsed on desktop site) does not include acts who had previously charted as part of a group and secured their first top 10 solo single.  

Notes
Cher Lloyd, One Direction and Rebecca Ferguson all featured on The X Factor finalists number-one charity single, a cover of David Bowie's "Heroes", at the end of 2010 before all went on to make their top 10 debut this year in their own right. Cher Lloyd's "Swagger Jagger" and One Direction's "What Makes You Beautiful" both topped the chart, while Rebecca Ferguson's "Nothing's Real But Love" made number ten.

Diddy – Dirty Money was a duo which included Diddy (real name Sean Combs, variously known as P Diddy, Diddy or Puff Daddy). Kimberley Walsh found fame in the line-up of Girls Aloud, who were formed on the talent show Popstars: The Rivals in 2002. After years of number-one singles, she guested on "Like U Like" by Aggro Santos for her first credit under her own name.

Dappy had several top 10 singles with his group N-Dubz but 2011 saw him go it alone with two entries, including chart-topper "No Regrets" and collaboration "Spaceship" with Tinchy Stryder. Bad Meets Evil was formed by Eminem (whose haul of top 10 singles included 7 number-ones) and Royce da 5'9".

Songs from films
Original songs from various films entered the top 10 throughout the year. These included "Iris" (from City of Angels, a re-entry due to the song's performance on The X Factor).

Best-selling singles
Adele had the best-selling single of the year with "Someone Like You". The song spent nine weeks in the top 10 (including five weeks at number one), sold over 1.24 million copies and was certified 3× platinum by the BPI (July 2013). "Moves Like Jagger" by Maroon 5 featuring Christina Aguilera came in second place, selling more than 1.04 million copies and losing out by around 200,000 sales. LMFAO featuring Lauren Bennett & GoonRock's "Party Rock Anthem, "Price Tag" from Jessie J featuring B.o.B, and "We Found Love" by Rihanna featuring Calvin Harris made up the top five. Singles by Pitbull featuring Ne-Yo, Afrojack & Nayer, Bruno Mars, Ed Sheeran, Adele ("Rolling in the Deep") and Jennifer Lopez featuring Pitbull were also in the top ten best-selling singles of the year.

Top-ten singles
Key

Entries by artist

The following table shows artists who achieved two or more top 10 entries in 2011, including singles that reached their peak in 2010 or 2012. The figures include both main artists and featured artists, while appearances on ensemble charity records are also counted for each artist. The total number of weeks an artist spent in the top ten in 2011 is also shown.

Notes

 "Make You Feel My Love" re-entered the top 10 at number 7 on 16 January following usage on Dancing on Ice.
 "Thinking of Me" re-entered the top 10 at number 10 on 2 January.
 "Who's That Chick?" re-entered the top 10 at number 10 on 9 January.
 "Lights On" re-entered the top 10 at number 4 on 9 January.
 "Do It Like a Dude" re-entered the top 10 at number 10 on 6 March following the release of the album, Who You Are.
 "Eyes Wide Shut" re-entered the top 10 at number 8 on 20 February following physical release.
 "S&M" re-entered the top 10 at number 7 on 17 April following the release of a remix featuring Britney Spears.
 "Fast Car" originally peaked at number 5 upon its initial release in 1988. It re-entered the top 10 at its brand new peak of number 4 on 30 April 2011 (week ending) following usage on Britain's Got Talent.
 "Judas" re-entered the top 10 at number 8 on 22 May following a performance at Radio 1's Big Weekend.
 "The Edge of Glory" re-entered the top 10 at number 8 on 26 June following the release of the accompanying music video.
 "Every Teardrop Is a Waterfall" re-entered the top 10 at number 10 on 3 July following a performance at Glastonbury Festival.
 "Back to Black" entered the top 10 at number 8 on 31 July following the death of Amy Winehouse, having originally peaked at number 25 upon release in 2007.
 "Jealousy" re-entered the top 10 at number 9 on 18 September following a price reduction on iTunes.
 "The A Team" re-entered the top 10 at number 7 on 25 September and again at number 9 on 16 October following usage on The X Factor.
 "Cannonball" entered the top 10 at number 9 on 25 September following usage on The X Factor, having originally peaked at number 19 upon release in 2004.
 "Iris" entered the top 10 at number 3 on 2 October following usage on The X Factor, having originally peaked at number 26 upon release in 1999.
 "Jar of Hearts" re-entered the top 10 at number 4 on 16 October following usage on The X Factor and again on 20 November at number 10 following a performance on Strictly Come Dancing.
 "Without You" re-entered the top 10 at number 10 on 6 November following a price reduction on iTunes.
 Figure includes song that peaked in 2010.
 Figure includes song that peaked in 2012.
 Released as the official single for Comic Relief.
 Figure includes appearance on Drake's "Take Care" and David Guetta's "Who's That Chick?".
 Figure includes appearance on Bad Meets Evil's "Lighters".
 Figure includes appearance on Rihanna's "We Found Love".
 Figure includes appearance on Chipmunk's "Champion".
 Figure includes appearance on Far East Movement's "Like a G6".
 Figure includes appearance on JLS' "She Makes Me Wanna".
 Figure includes appearance on Wretch 32's "Unorthodox".
 Figure includes appearance on Olly Murs' "Heart Skips a Beat".
 Figure includes appearance on Mann's "Buzzin'" and Nicole Scherzinger's "Right There".
 Figure includes appearance on Gym Class Heroes' "Stereo Hearts".
 Figure includes one top 10 single with the group Maroon 5.
 Figure includes appearance on Dev's "Bass Down Low".
 Figure includes appearance on Rihanna's "What's My Name?".
 Figure includes appearance on Professor Green's "Read All About It".
 Figure includes appearance on Dr. Dre's "I Need a Doctor".
 Figures includes one top 10 single with the group Bad Meets Evil.
 Figure includes appearance on David Guetta's "Where Them Girls At".
 Figure includes appearance on Alex Gaudino's "What a Feeling".
 Figure includes appearances on Lloyd's "Dedication to My Ex (Miss That)" and Jennifer Lopez's "I'm Into You".
 Figure includes appearance on David Guetta's "Little Bad Girl" 
 Figure includes appearance on Jennifer Lopez's "On the Floor".
 Figure includes appearance on Diddy — Dirty Money's "Coming Home".
 Figure includes appearance on Enrique Iglesias' "Tonight (I'm Lovin' You)".
 Figure includes appearances on Labrinth's "Earthquake" and JLS' "Eyes Wide Shut".
 Figure includes appearance on Taio Cruz's "Higher".
 Figure includes one top 10 single with the group Gym Class Heroes.
 Figure includes appearance on T-Pain's "5 O'Clock".
 Figure includes appearance on "Wishing on a Star" as part of The X Factor UK 2011 finalists.
 Figure includes song that first charted in 2010 but peaked in 2011.

See also
2011 in British music
List of number-one singles from the 2010s (UK)

References
General

Specific

External links
2011 singles chart archive at the Official Charts Company (click on relevant week)

United Kingdom
Top 10 singles
2011